Eddie Gordon (born July 22, 1983) is a Jamaican mixed martial artist who most recently competed in the Middleweight division of the Professional Fighters League. A professional since 2011, he has also competed for the UFC and was the winner of The Ultimate Fighter: Team Edgar vs. Team Penn.

Background
Gordon attended Fordham University and graduated with a degree in finance and in marketing and communications. He worked as a finance director and then a sales consultant before pursuing MMA. He started training for MMA after running into his old high school friend Chris Weidman, who is the former UFC Middleweight champion.

Mixed martial arts career

The Ultimate Fighter
Gordon was revealed as one of the cast members of the nineteenth season of The Ultimate Fighter on March 25, 2014. In the elimination rounds, he defeated Matt Gabel by unanimous decision after two rounds. He was then chosen as the third pick for the middleweights on coach  Frankie Edgar's team.

In the quarter-final rounds, Gordon fought Team Penn's first middleweight pick Mike King. Gordon defeated King by unanimous decision after three rounds. Afterwards Dana White described the fight as "terrible" since he felt that the fighters had no sense of urgency to win. Gordon fought Cathal Pendred in the semi-finals. He won the bout by split decision, securing his place at the finale.

Ultimate Fighting Championship
Gordon faced teammate Dhiego Lima in the middleweight finals on July 6, 2014, at The Ultimate Fighter 19 Finale. He was victorious via first-round KO to become the middleweight tournament winner.

Gordon faced Josh Samman on December 6, 2014, at UFC 181. Despite winning the first round, Gordon lost the fight in the second round via knockout due to a head kick.

Gordon faced Chris Dempsey on April 18, 2015, at UFC on Fox: Machida vs. Rockhold. He lost the fight by split decision.

Gordon faced Antônio Carlos Júnior on June 27, 2015, at UFC Fight Night 70 Gordon lost the fight via submission in the third round.

On October 16, 2015, via his Facebook page Gordon announced that he had been released by the UFC.

Independent Promotions
Gordon made his return after over a year out of the cage on August 4, 2016, winning a split decision over Bellator veteran Chris Lozano at Cage Fury Fighting Championships 60 at the Borgata Hotel Casino and Spa in Atlantic City, New Jersey.

The Ultimate Fighter: Redemption
In February 2017, it was revealed that Gordon would again compete on the UFC's reality show in the 25th season on The Ultimate Fighter: Redemption. Gordon was the third pick overall for Team Garbrandt. He faced Tom Gallicchio and lost via submission in the opening round.

Championships and accomplishments
Ultimate Fighting Championship
The Ultimate Fighter 19 Tournament Winner
Ring of Combat
Ring of Combat Light Heavyweight Championship (one time)

Mixed martial arts record

|-
|Loss
|align=center| 8–7
|John Howard
|Decision (unanimous)
|PFL 10
|
|align=center|2
|align=center|5:00
|Washington, D.C., United States
|
|-
|Loss
| align=center| 8–6
|Gasan Umalatov
|Decision (unanimous)
|PFL 6
|
|align=center|3
|align=center|5:00
|Atlantic City, New Jersey, United States
|
|-
|Loss
| align=center| 8–5
|Shamil Gamzatov
|Decision (unanimous)
|PFL 3
|
|align=center|3
|align=center|5:00
|Washington, D.C., United States
|
|-
|Win
| align=center| 8–4
| Chris Lozano
| Decision (split)
| Cage Fury Fighting Championships 60
| 
| align=center| 3
| align=center| 5:00
| Atlantic City, New Jersey, United States
|
|-
|Loss
| align=center| 7–4
| Antônio Carlos Júnior
| Submission (rear-naked choke)
| UFC Fight Night: Machida vs. Romero
| 
| align=center| 3
| align=center| 4:37
| Hollywood, Florida, United States
|
|-
|Loss
|align=center| 7–3
|Chris Dempsey
|Decision (split)
|UFC on Fox: Machida vs. Rockhold
|
|align=center| 3
|align=center| 5:00
|Newark, New Jersey, United States
|
|-
|Loss
|align=center| 7–2
|Josh Samman
|KO (head kick)
|UFC 181
|
|align=center| 2
|align=center| 3:08
|Las Vegas, Nevada, United States
|
|-
|Win
|align=center| 7–1
|Dhiego Lima
|KO (punches)
|The Ultimate Fighter: Team Edgar vs. Team Penn Finale
|
|align=center|1
|align=center|1:11
|Las Vegas, Nevada, United States
|
|-
|Win
|align=center| 6–1
|Oscar Delgado
|Submission (rear-naked choke)
|CFA 11
|
|align=center|2
|align=center|1:32
|Coral Gables, Florida, United States
|
|-
|Loss
|align=center| 5–1
|Anton Talamantes
|Decision (unanimous)
|Ring of Combat 42
|
|align=center|3
|align=center|5:00
|Atlantic City, New Jersey, United States
|
|-
|Win
|align=center| 5–0
|Carlos Brooks
|Decision (unanimous)
|Ring of Combat 41
|
|align=center|3
|align=center|5:00
|Atlantic City, New Jersey, United States
|
|-
|Win
|align=center| 4–0
|Ryan Contaldi
|KO (punch)
|Ring of Combat 40
|
|align=center| 1
|align=center| 2:58
|Atlantic City, New Jersey, United States
|
|-
|Win
|align=center| 3–0
|David Tkeshelashvili
|Decision (majority)
|Ring of Combat 39
|
|align=center| 3
|align=center| 4:00
|Atlantic City, New Jersey, United States
|
|-
|Win
|align=center| 2–0
|Steve Edwards
|TKO (doctor stoppage)
|Ring of Combat 37
|
|align=center| 2
|align=center| 4:00
|Atlantic City, New Jersey, United States
|
|-
|Win
|align=center| 1–0
|J.A. Dudley
|Decision (unanimous)
|Ring of Combat 36
|
|align=center| 3
|align=center| 4:00
|Atlantic City, New Jersey, United States
|

Mixed martial arts exhibition record

|-
|Loss
|align=center|3-1
|Tom Gallicchio
|Submission (rear-naked choke)
|The Ultimate Fighter: Redemption
| (airdate)
|align=center|1
|align=center|
|Las Vegas, Nevada, United States
|
|-
|Win
|align=center|3-0
|Cathal Pendred
|Decision (split)
|The Ultimate Fighter: Team Edgar vs. Team Penn
| (airdate)
|align=center|3
|align=center|5:00
|Las Vegas, Nevada, United States
|
|-
|Win
|align=center|2-0
|Mike King
|Decision (unanimous)
|The Ultimate Fighter: Team Edgar vs. Team Penn
| (airdate)
|align=center|3
|align=center|5:00
|Las Vegas, Nevada, United States
|
|-
|Win
|align=center|1-0
|Matt Gabel
|Decision (unanimous)
|The Ultimate Fighter: Team Edgar vs. Team Penn
| (airdate)
|align=center|2
|align=center|5:00
|Las Vegas, Nevada, United States
|
|-

See also
 List of male mixed martial artists

References

External links
 
 

Jamaican emigrants to the United States
Jamaican male mixed martial artists
Jamaican practitioners of Brazilian jiu-jitsu
American male mixed martial artists
American practitioners of Brazilian jiu-jitsu
Middleweight mixed martial artists
Mixed martial artists utilizing Brazilian jiu-jitsu
Mixed martial artists from New York (state)
Living people
1983 births
Gabelli School of Business alumni
Ultimate Fighting Championship male fighters